The Big Unit is a collaborative studio album by American rappers Lil' Keke and Slim Thug. It was released on July 8, 2003, via Noddfactor Entertainment. The album peaked at number 37 on the US Billboard Top R&B/Hip-Hop Albums chart.

Track listing

Personnel
Marcus Lakee Edwards – vocals (tracks: 1-6, 8-17)
Stayve Jerome Thomas – vocals (tracks: 1-11, 13-17)
Dorie Lee Dorsey – vocals (track 2)
Premro Smith – vocals (track 4)
Eric Taylor – vocals (track 10)
Winston Taylor Rogers – vocals (track 11)
Bernard Freeman – vocals (track 13)
Kyle Riley – vocals (track 14)
T. Harris – vocals (track 16)
Leroy Williams, Jr. – producer (tracks: 2-4, 6-8, 10-16), executive producer
Michael George Dean – producer (tracks: 7, 15), mastering
Lee Hines – engineering
Mike Moore – engineering
Tony Laughlin – engineering

Charts

References

External links

 

2003 albums
Lil' Keke albums
Slim Thug albums
Albums produced by Mike Dean (record producer)
Rap-A-Lot Records albums